Didargylyç Urazow (27 February 1977 – 7 June 2016) was a Turkmen footballer as a striker. He is a former member of the Turkmenistan national football team.

Club career
In 2010, he returned to Ýokary Liga. As part of Balkan FK he became champion of Turkmenistan, and in the list of top-scorers he shared second place (10 goals). In 2011, together with Balkan FK, he  repeatedly became champion of Turkmenistan, but did not differ in high productivity (three goals after the first 22 rounds). In 2013, he won the 2013 AFC President's Cup. In 2010–2014, he played for Balkan FK, where he ended his career.

Club career stats

International career statistics

Goals for senior national team

References

External links

1977 births
2016 deaths
Turkmenistan footballers
Expatriate footballers in Kazakhstan
Ukrainian Premier League players
Kazakhstan Premier League players
FC Metalist Kharkiv players
FC Irtysh Pavlodar players
FC Ahal players
FC Tobol players
Turkmenistan international footballers
Turkmenistan expatriate footballers
Turkmenistan expatriate sportspeople in Kazakhstan
Turkmenistan expatriate sportspeople in Ukraine
Expatriate footballers in Ukraine
Association football forwards
Footballers at the 2002 Asian Games
Sportspeople from Ashgabat
Asian Games competitors for Turkmenistan